Written in 1846, the Piano Trio in G minor, opus 17 by Clara Schumann was her only piano trio and was composed during her stay in Dresden 1845-1846. During the development of the Trio, she was going through hardships in life. Her husband Robert Schumann was extremely ill. This trio was completed during the summer of 1846 when they traveled to Norderney in attempts to improve Robert's health conditions. While in Norderney, Clara suffered from miscarriage. A year after the composition of her piano trio, Robert composed his first piano trio, op.63. It is seen that Clara's trio has had great influences on Robert's trio as they both share many interesting similarities. Their works were frequently paired at concerts.

Clara Schumann's compositions include 30 Lieder (songs), choral music, solo piano pieces, 1 piano concerto, chamber and orchestral works. The Piano Trio has been called "probably" the "masterpiece" among her compositions. The work, written for a piano trio comprising piano, violin and cello, was her first attempt at writing music for instruments other than the voice and piano.

Structure

The composition is in four movements:

Allegro moderato in G minor, in common (4/4) time with a tempo of 152 crotchets to the minute.  
Scherzo and Trio in B-flat major and E-flat major, respectively. The Scherzo is in 3/4 time and has a tempo of 160 crotchets to the minute.  The Trio is also in 3/4 time and shows no change in tempo from the Scherzo. 
Andante in G major, in 6/8 time and 112 quavers to the minute. 
Allegretto in G minor, in 2/4 time and 96 crotchets to the minute.

Detail

Movement 1
The overall key of this movement is G Minor, with a lot of modulation both to closer and more distant keys. The structure of the movement is Sonata form (made up of the Exposition, Development, and Recapitulation), with a Codetta and then a Coda. It is in Allegro moderato. It relies on energy and chromaticism to attract the audience. Throughout the movement, each instrument has its own soloist moment on top of an exceptional balance between three instruments. This balance makes it clear that Clara had a great understanding of writing for these three instruments although she was a pianist.

Movement 2 
The 2nd movement consists of three sections; Scherzo, Trio, and Scherzo. The Scherzo is in B-flat major, the same key as the relative major of the first movement, and it instructed to be played in the "Tempo di minuetto" which means slow, graceful and playful. The melody is often played by the violin, while the cello accompanies the melody through pizzicato as the piano plays chords. These contrasts between the cello and piano successfully create the mood of the "Tempo di minuetto". After Scherzo, a contrasting section, Trio, appears. It is in E-flat major and is more lyrical than Scherzo. However, the overall mood of the piece is still playful. At last, it goes back to Scherzo to finish the movement.

Movement 3 
The 3rd movement, Andante, is in G major and begins with an 8 measures piano solo. Soon after, the violin takes over the theme. In the middle of movement all three parts play dotted rhythms, which contribute to the contrast of the emotion of the piece. The piece could be described as "bittersweet".

Movement 4 
The last movement, Allegretto, is in sonata form again. The opening is similar to the opening theme of the first movement, which resembles "dramatic intensity".

See also
List of compositions by Clara Schumann

References

External links

 Performed by the Galos Piano Trio at St. Martin in the Fields 26 May 2015.

Compositions by Clara Schumann
Schumann, Clara
1846 compositions
Compositions in G minor